Death by a thousand cuts is a form of torture and execution originating from Imperial China.

Death by a Thousand Cuts may also refer to:

 Death by a thousand cuts (psychology), the way a major negative change which happens slowly in many unnoticed increments is not perceived as objectionable
 Death by a Thousand Cuts (album), a 2002 album by the band Leng Tch'e
 Death by a Thousand Cuts (book), a 2008 non-fiction book about a form of torture and capital punishment in Imperial China
 "Death by a Thousand Cuts", a song by Taylor Swift from the album Lover, 2019
 "Death by a Thousand Cuts", a song by Bullet for My Valentine from the album Bullet for My Valentine, 2021
 "Death by a Thousand Cuts", a 2021 song by Like a Storm

See also
 A Thousand Cuts, a 2020 Filipino-American film by Ramona S. Diaz